Democratic Party (in Spanish: Partido Democráta) was a political party in Peru. Its president was  Juan Vicente Nicolini.

Defunct political parties in Peru
Political parties with year of disestablishment missing
Political parties with year of establishment missing